La Bandida ("The Bandida") is a 1963 Mexican film. It stars María Félix.

Cast 

 María Félix as María Mendoza 'La Bandida'
 Pedro Armendáriz as Roberto Herrera
 Ignacio Lopez Tarso as Anselmo
 Emilio Fernandez as Epigmenio Gomez
 Katy Jurado as La Jarocha
 Lola Beltrán as Cantante de palenque (Singer of palenque)

References

External links 
 

1963 films
Mexican musical drama films
1960s Spanish-language films
Films directed by Roberto Rodríguez
1960s Mexican films
Mexican romantic drama films